Doe Run is an unincorporated community and census-designated place in St. Francois County, Missouri, United States. It is located on Routes 221 and B, approximately three miles southwest of Farmington.

Demographics

History
Doe Run had its start in 1880 as a lead-mining town. A post office called Doe Run has been in operation since 1887. The community takes its name from nearby Doe Run Creek.

References

Census-designated places in St. Francois County, Missouri
Census-designated places in Missouri
Unincorporated communities in St. Francois County, Missouri
Unincorporated communities in Missouri